April Wine Rocks! is a compilation album by the Canadian rock band April Wine, released in 2006, which features songs recorded during their time on the Aquarius Records label (1971–1986).

Track listing 
All tracks written by Myles Goodwyn unless otherwise noted.
 "Hot on the Wheels of Love" (M. Goodwyn, S. Lang)
 "Tonite"
 "Future Tense"
 "21st Century Schizoid Man" (R. Fripp, M. Giles, G. Lake, I. McDonald, P. Sinfield)
 "Crash and Burn"
 "Oowatanite" (J. Clench)
 "Get Ready for Love"
 "Tellin’ Me Lies"
 "Don’t Push Me Around"
 "Gimme Love" (M. Goodwyn, Hovaness "Johnny" Hagopian)
 "I Like to Rock (Live)"

Personnel 
 Myles Goodwyn – vocals, guitar
 Jim Clench – bass, vocals
 Steve Lang – bass, background vocals
 Brian Greenway – guitars, vocals
 Gary Moffet – guitars, background vocals
 Jerry Mercer – drums & percussion, background vocals

Various producers 
 Myles Goodwyn – producer 
 Nick Blagona – producer 
 Mike Stone – producer 
 Gene Cornish – producer
 Dino Danelli – producer

References 

April Wine albums
2006 greatest hits albums
Albums produced by Mike Stone (record producer)
Albums produced by Myles Goodwyn
Aquarius Records (Canada) compilation albums
Albums produced by Nick Blagona